Agraylea multipunctata, the salt and pepper microcaddis, is a species of microcaddisfly in the family Hydroptilidae. It is found in Europe and Northern Asia (excluding China).

References

External links

 

Hydroptilidae
Articles created by Qbugbot
Insects described in 1834